The  was held on 8 February 1998 in Kannai Hall, Yokohama, Kanagawa, Japan.

Awards
 Best Film: Onibi
 Best Actor: Yoshio Harada – Onibi
 Best Actress: Kyōka Suzuki – Welcome Back, Mr. McDonald
 Best Supporting Actor:
Masahiko Nishimura – Welcome Back, Mr. McDonald, Marutai no Onna
Isao Bitoh – Sharan Q no enka no hanamichi
 Best Supporting Actress: Reiko Kataoka – Onibi
 Best Director: Rokurō Mochizuki – Onibi, Koi Gokudō
 Best New Director: Kōki Mitani – Welcome Back, Mr. McDonald
 Best Screenplay: Masato Harada – Bounce Ko Gals
 Best Cinematography: Yoshitaka Sakamoto – Bounce Ko Gals
 Best New Talent:
Ryōko Hirosue – 20-seiki Nostalgia
Yukiko Okamoto – Bounce Ko Gals
Hitomi Satō – Bounce Ko Gals
Yasue Sato – Bounce Ko Gals
 Special Jury Prize: Sharan Q no enka no hanamichi

Best 10
 Onibi
 Bounce Ko Gals
 Kizu darake no Tenshi
 Welcome Back, Mr. McDonald
 Postman Blues
 Yūkai
 Sharan Q no enka no hanamichi
 Tōkyō Biyori
 My Secret Cache
 Princess Mononoke
runner-up. Watashitachi ga Sukidatta Koto

References

Yokohama Film Festival
1998 film festivals
1998 in Japanese cinema
Yoko
February 1998 events in Asia